Santa Terezinha de Goiás is a municipality in north Goiás state, Brazil.  Santa Terezinha is sometimes written as "Santa Teresinha".

Location
Santa Terezinha is in the extreme north of the state, 174 km. southwest of Porangatu. It is 66 km. west of the important BR-153 highway.

Highway connections from Goiânia are made by GO-080 / Nerópolis / São Francisco de Goiás / BR-153 / Jaraguá / Rianápolis / Rialma / GO-336 / Itapaci / GO-154 / Pilar de Goiás.

Santa Terezinha de Goiás is bordered by the following municipalities: 
north:  Campos Verdes de Goiás and Mara Rosa
south:  Guarinos 
east:  Uruaçu 
west:  Crixás

Political Information
Mayor: Vitalino da Silva Muniz (January 2005)
City council: 09
Eligible voters: 8,998 (December/2007)

Demographics
Population density: 9.61 inhabitants/km2 (2007)
Urban population: 8,673 (2007)
Rural population: 2,885 (2007)
Population change: 1.37% 1996/2007

The economy
The economy is based on modest agriculture, cattle raising, services, public administration, and small transformation industries.  
Industrial units: 18 (2007)
Retail units: 111 (2007), employing 275 workers in 2005
Financial institutions: Banco do Brasil S.A. - BRADESCO S.A. (01/06/2005)
Automobiles: 567  (2007)

Agricultural Data (2006)
Farms: 691
Total agricultural Area:  66,678 hectares
Permanent Planted Area: 2,297 hectares
Temporary Planted Area: 3,441 hectares
Natural Pasture: 43,488 hectares
Woodland and Forest: 15,177 hectares
Workers related to the farm owner: 1,609
Workers not related to the farm owner: 188  (IBGE)
Cattle herd: 77,000 head (2006)
Main crops: rice (280 hectares), bananas, beans, manioc, corn (900 hectares), palm hearts and coconut.

Education (2006)
Schools: 11 with 3,503 students
Higher education: campus of the Universidade Estadual de Goiás
Adult literacy rate: 83.0% (2000) (national average was 86.4%)

Health (2007)
Hospitals: 1
Hospital beds: 43
Ambulatory clinics: 5
Infant mortality rate: 27.56 (2000) (national average was 33.
 
Municipal Human Development Index
MHDI:  0.721
State ranking:  171 (out of 242 municipalities in 2000)
National ranking:  2,607 (out of 5,507 municipalities in 2000)

Seplan Economic Development Index
The ranking was 168  out of 246 municipalities. See Seplan

Seplan Social Development Index
The ranking was 101 out of 246 municipalities.  See Seplan

See also
List of municipalities in Goiás
Microregions of Goiás

References

Frigoletto

Municipalities in Goiás